The Port of Wilmington may refer to:
 Port of Wilmington (Delaware), a port facility in Wilmington, Delaware, USA
 Port of Wilmington (North Carolina), a port facility in Wilmington, North Carolina, USA
 North Carolina International Port, an expansion of the Port of Wilmington facility near Southport, North Carolina, USA